Canada is represented at the 2006 Commonwealth Games in Melbourne by a contingent, comprising 253 sportspersons.

Flag bearers 
Wheelchair racing athlete Chantal Petitclerc was chosen as Canada's flag bearer at the opening ceremonies. Rhythmic gymnast Alexandra Orlando was chosen as Canada's flag bearer at the closing ceremonies.

Medalists

Gold Medalists

Silver 
Athletics:
 Nathan Brannen, Men's 1500 m
 Jennifer Joyce, Women's Hammer
 Jacques Martin, Men's Seated Discus EAD
 James Steacy, Men's Hammer
 Achraf Tadili, Men's 800 m
 Jason Tunks, Men's Discus
 Angela Whyte, Women's 100 m Hurdles

Boxing:
 Adonis Stevenson, Middleweight 75 kg

Cycling:
 Travis Smith, Men's Keirin

Diving:
 Women's Synchronised 3 m Springboard

Gymnastics:
 Nathan Garfuik, Men's All-Around
 Nathan Garfuik, Men's Vault
 Elyse Hopfner-Hibbs, Women's All-Around
 Yana Tsikaridze, Women's Artistic Ribbon

Shooting:
 Kim Eagles, Women's 25 m Pistol
 Men's Trap Pairs
 Women's 10 m Air Rifle Pairs
 Women's Double Trap Pairs

Swimming:
 Brent Hayden, Men's 50 m Freestyle
 Valerie Grandmaison, Women's 100 m EAD Freestyle
 Benoît Huot, Men's 50 m EAD Freestyle
 Benoît Huot, Men's 100 m EAD Freestyle
 Andrew Hurd, Men's 400 m Freestyle
 Andrew Hurd, Men's 1500 m Freestyle
 Anne Polinario, Women's 50 m EAD Freestyle

Weightlifting:
 Christine Girard, Women's 63 kg
 Marilou Dozois-Prévost, Women's 48 kg
 Emily Beth Quarton, Women's 58 kg

Bronze 
Athletics:
 Stephanie McCann, Women's Pole Vault
 Diane Roy, Women's 800 m EAD T54
 Dariusz Slowick, Men's Discu
 Men's 4x100 m Relay

Cycling:
 Kiara Bisaro, Women's Cross Country
 Seamus McGrath, Men's Cross Country
 Travis Smith, Men's Sprint

Diving:
 Alexandre Despatie, Men's 10 m Platform
 Émilie Heymans, Women's 10 m Platform
 Women's Synchronised 10 m Platform

Gymnastics:
 Grant Golding, Men's Pommel Horse
 Kyle Shewfelt, Men's Floor
 Yana Tsikaridze, Women's Artistic All-Around
 Yana Tsikaridze, Women's Artistic Rope
 Women's Artistic Team

Lawn Bowls:
 Ryan Bester

Shooting:
 Kim Eagles, Women's 10 m Air Pistol
 Cynthia Meyers, Women's Double Trap
 Clayton Miller, Men's Skeet
 Susan Marie Nattrass, Women's Trap
 Men's 25 m Rapid Fire Pistol Pairs
 Women's 25 m Pistol Pairs

Swimming:
 Brent Hayden, Men's 200 m Freestyle
 Brian Johns, Men's 200 m Individual Medley
 Audrey Lacroix, Women's 100 m Butterfly
 Anne Polinario, Women's 100 m EAD Freestyle
 Brittany Reimer, Women's 800 m Freestyle
 Men's 4x100 m Freestyle Relay
 Women's 4x100 m Freestyle Relay
 Women's 4x100 m Medley Relay

Weightlifting:
 Miel McGerrigle, Women's 63 kg

Canada's Commonwealth Games Team 2006

Aquatics

Diving 
 Rebecca Barras - 3 m Synchronised
 Meaghan Benfeito - 3 m Synchronised, Platform Synchronised
 Alexandre Despatie - 1 m Springboard, 3 m Springboard, Platform, 3 m Synchronised
 Roseline Filion - Platform, Platform Synchronised
 Kevin Geyson - 3 m Springboard, Platform, 3 m Synchronised, Platform Synchronised
 Wegadesk Gorup-Paul - Platform, Platform Synchronised
 Blythe Hartley - 1 m Springboard, 3 m Springboard
 Émilie Heymans - 3 m Springboard, Platform, Platform Synchronised
 Rachel Kemp - 1 m Springboard, Platform, 3 m Synchronised, Platform Synchronised
 Riley McCormick - Platform Synchronised
 Cameron McLean - 1 m Springboard, 3 m Synchronised, Platform Synchronised
 Arturo Miranda - 1 m Springboard, 3 m Springboard, 3 m Synchronised
 Melanie Rinaldi - 1 m Springboard, 3 m Springboard, 3 m Synchronised

Swimming 
 Maya Beaudry - 400 m Freestyle, 4 × 200 m Freestyle Relay
 Mathieu Bois - 50 m Breaststroke, 100 m Breaststroke, 200 m Breaststroke
 Mike Brown - 50 m breaststroke, 100 m Breaststroke, 200 m Breaststroke, 4 × 100 m Medley Relay
 Ryan Cochrane - 400 m Freestyle, 1500 m Freestyle, 4 × 200 m Freestyle Relay
 Marie-Pier Couillard - 50 m backstroke, 200 m Individual Medley
 Scott Dickens - 50 m Breaststroke, 100 m Breaststroke, 200 m Breaststroke, 4 × 100 m Medley Relay
 Chelsey Gotell - EAD- 50 m Freestyle, EAD- 100 m Freestyle
 Valérie Grand'Maison - EAD- 50 m Freestyle, EAD- 100 m Freestyle
 Brent Hayden - 50 m Freestyle, 100 m Freestyle, 200 m Freestyle, 4 × 100 m Freestyle Relay, 4 × 200 m Freestyle Relay, 4 × 100 m Medley Relay
 Brian Hill - EAD - 50 m Freestyle, EAD- 100 m Freestyle
 Benoît Huot - EAD- 50 m Freestyle, EAD- 100 m Freestyle
 Andrew Hurd - 400 m Freestyle, 1500 m Freestyle, 4 × 200 m Freestyle Relay
 Brian Johns - 100 m Backstroke, 200 m Freestyle, 200 m Individual Medley, 4 × 200 m Freestyle Relay
 Thomas Kindler - 50 m Butterfly, 100 m Butterfly, 4 × 100 m Medley Relay
 Audrey Lacroix - 50 m Butterfly, 100 m Butterfly, 200 m Butterfly, 4 × 100 m Medley Relay
 Yannick Lupien - 50 m Freestyle, 100 m Freestyle, 4 × 100 m Freestyle Relay, 4 × 200 m Freestyle Relay, 4 × 100 m Medley Relay
 Erica Morningstar - 50 m Freestyle, 100 m Freestyle, 200 m Freestyle, 4 × 100 m Freestyle Relay, 4 × 200 m Freestyle Relay, 4 × 100 m Medley Relay
 Anne Polinario - EAD- 50 m Freestyle, EAD- 100 m Freestyle
 Victoria Poon - 50 m Freestyle, 4 × 100 m Freestyle Relay
 Brittany Reimer - 200 m Freestyle, 400 m Freestyle, 800 m Freestyle, 4 × 200 m Freestyle Relay
 Matt Rose - 50 m Backstroke, 50 m Freestyle, 100 m Backstroke, 100 m Freestyle, 4 × 100 m Freestyle Relay, 4 × 100 m Medley Relay
 Darryl Rudolf - 50 m Butterfly, 100 m Butterfly, 4 × 100 m Medley Relay
 Colin Russell - 400 m Freestyle, 4 × 100 m Freestyle Relay, 4 × 200 m Freestyle Relay
 Geneviève Saumur - 50 m Butterfly, 50 m Freestyle, 100 m Freestyle, 4 × 100 m Freestyle Relay, 4 × 200 m Freestyle Relay, 4 × 100 m Medley Relay
 Rick Say - 200 m Freestyle, 4 × 100 m Freestyle Relay, 4 × 200 m Freestyle Relay
 Sophie Simard - 100 m Freestyle, 200 m Butterfly, 200 m Freestyle, 4 × 100 m Freestyle Relay, 4 × 200 m Freestyle Relay
 Kelly Stefanyshyn - 50 m Butterfly, 100 m Backstroke, 100 m Butterfly, 200 m Backstroke, 4 × 100 m Medley Relay
 Desmond Strelzow - 100 m Backstroke, 200 m Backstroke
 Donovan Tildesley - EAD- 50 m Freestyle, EAD- 100 m Freestyle
 Lauren van Oosten - 50 m Breaststroke, 100 m Breaststroke, 200 m Breaststroke, 4 × 100 m Medley Relay
 Landice Yestrau - 50 m Backstroke, 100 m Backstroke, 200 m Backstroke

Synchronised swimming 
 Marie-Pier Boudreau Gagnon - Solo, Duet
 Jessika Dubuc - Duet
 Isabelle Rampling - Duet

Athletics 
 Charles Allen - 110 m Hurdles, 4 × 100 m Relay
 Courtney Babcock -1500 m, 5000 m, 10000 m
 Tim Berrett - 50 km Walk
 Mark Boswell - High Jump
 Nathan Brannen - 800 m, 1500 m
 Erica Broomfield - 100 m, 200 m
 Pierre Browne - 100 m, 200 m, 4 × 100 m Relay
 Reid Coolsaet - 1500 m, 5000 m
 Diane Cummins - 800 m
 Tawa Dortch - 400 m Hurdles, 4 × 400 m Relay
 Carmen Douma-Hussar - 1500 m
 Dana Ellis - Pole Vault
 Malindi Elmore - 1500 m
 Tracey Ferguson - EAD- 800 m T54
 Nicole Forrester - High Jump
 David Gill - 800 m, 1500 m
 Kelsie Hendry - Pole Vault
 Anson Henry - 100 m, 200 m, 4 × 100 m Relay
 Jennifer Joyce - Hammer
 Matthew Kerr - 3000 m Steeplechase
 Lioudmila Kortchguina - Marathon
 Jared MacLeod - 100 m Hurdles
 Jacques Martin - EAD- Seated Discus
 Stephanie McCann - Pole Vault
 Hank Palmer - 100 m, 200 m, 4 × 100 m Relay
 Emanuel Parris - 4 × 100 m Relay
 Chantal Petitclerc - EAD- 800 m T54
 Tara Quinn-Smith - 10000 m
 Gary Reed - 800 m, 4 × 400 m Relay
 Diane Roy - EAD- 800 m T54
 Scott Russell - Javelin
 Dariusz Slowik - Discus
 James Steacy - Hammer
 Hilary Stellingwerff - 1500 m
 Nicole Stevenson - Marathon
 Kevin Sullivan - 1500 m
 Achraf Tadili - 800 m
 Nathan Taylor - 4 × 100 m Relay
 Aimee Teteris - 800 m
 Jason Tunks - Discus
 Katie Vermeulen - 800 m, 1500 m
 Angela Whyte - 100 m Hurdles
 Derek Woodske - Hammer
 Jessica Zelinka - Heptathlon

Badminton 
 Mike Beres - Team (Mixed), Doubles, Mixed Doubles
 Philippe Bourret - Team (Mixed), Singles, Mixed Doubles
 Andrew Dabeka - Team (Mixed), Singles
 Valerie Loker - Team (Mixed), Doubles, Mixed Doubles
 Bobby Milroy - Team (Mixed), Singles
 William Milroy - Team (Mixed), Doubles
 Helen Nichol - Team (Mixed), Doubles, Mixed Doubles
 Charmaine Reid - Team (Mixed), Singles, Doubles
 Anna Rice - Team (Mixed), Singles
 Tammy Sun - Team (Mixed), Doubles, Mixed Doubles

Basketball

Boxing 
 Kevin Bizier - Light Welterweight (64 kg)
 Glenn Hunter - Light Heavyweight (81 kg)
 Ibrahim Kamal - Lightweight (60 kg)
 Robert Montgomery - Super Heavyweight (over 91 kg)
 Gino Nardari - Heavyweight (91 kg)
 Ryan Rannelli Flyweight (51 kg)
 Isho Shiba - Bantamweight (54 kg)
 Adonis Stevenson - Middleweight (75 kg)
 Adam Trupish - Welterweight (69 kg)
 Arash Usmanee - Featherweight (57 kg)

Cycling 
 Zach Bell - 1000 m Time Trial, 20 km Scratch Race, 40 km Points Race, Road Time Trial
 Lyne Bessette - Road Time Trial, Road Race
 Kiara Bisaro - Individual Cross Country
 Gord Fraser - Road Time Trial, Road Race
 Martin Gilbert - 20 km Scratch Race, 40 km Points Race, Road Race
 Gina Grain - 25 km Points Race, Road Race
 Geoff Kabush - Road Race, Individual Cross Country
 Cam MacKinnon - Sprint, Team Sprint, Keirin
 Seamus McGrath - Individual Cross Country
 Amy Moore - Road Time Trial, Road Race
 Yannik Morin - Sprint, Team Sprint, Keirin
 Sue Palmer-Komar - Road Time Trial, Road Race
 François Parisien - Road Race
 Dominique Perras - Road Race
 Mandy Poitras - 25 km Points Race
 Marie-Hélène Prémont - Individual Cross Country
 Travis Smith - Sprint, 1000 m Time Trial, Team Sprint, Keirin
 Svein Tuft - Road Time Trial, Road Race
 Erinne Willock - Road Race

EAD Events

Table tennis

Gymnastics

Artistic 
 Alyssa Brown
Women's Alternate
 Nathan Gafuik
 Crystal Gilmore
 Grant Golding
 Brittnee Habbib
 Elyse Hopfner-Hibbs
 Jenna Kerbis
 David Kikuchi
 Gael Mackie
 Kyle Shewfelt
 Adam Wong

Rhythmic 
 Alexandra Orlando
 Carly Orava
 Yana Tzikaridze

Field hockey

Men 
 Robin D'Abreo
 Wayne Fernandes
 Connor Grimes
 David Jameson
 Ravi Kahlon
 Michael Lee
 Mike Mahood
 Matthew Peck
 Ken Pereira
 Scott Sandison
 Marian Schole
 Peter Short
 Rob Short
 Paul Wettlaufer
 Philip Wright
 Anthony Wright

Women 
 Megan Anderson
 Johanna Bischof
 Kim Buker
 Deborah Cuthbert
 Sarah Forbes
 Stephanie Hume
 Stephanie Jameson
 Alexandra Johnstone
 Robin Leslie-Spencer
 Clare Linton
 Azelia Liu
 Lauren MacLean
 Tiffany Michaluk
 Kelly Rezansoff
 Andrea Rushton
 Katie Rushton

Lawn bowls

Netball

Rugby sevens 
 Mike Danskin
 Derek Daypuck
 Kyle Haley
 Brodie Henderson
 Matt King
 Robin MacDowell
 Justin Mensah-Coker
 David Moonlight
 Richard O'Malley
 Christoph Strubin
 Akio Tyler
 Morgan Williams

Shooting 
 Tye Bietz - Clay Target- Trap, Trap (Pairs), Double Trap, Double Trap (Pairs)
 Diana Cabrera - Small Bore- 50 m Rifle 3 positions, 50 m Rifle 3 positions (Pairs), 50 m Rifle Prone, 50 m Rifle Prone (Pairs)
 Avianna Chao - Pistol- 10 m Air Pistol, 10 m Air Pistol (Pairs), 25 m Pistol, 25 m Pistol (Pairs)
 Kim Eagles  - Pistol- 10 m Air Pistol, 10 m Air Pistol (Pairs), 25 m Pistol, 25 m Pistol (Pairs)
 Monica Fyfe - Small Bore- 10 m Air Rifle, 10 m Air Rifle (Pairs)
 Cindy Hamulas - Small Bore- 10 m Air Rifle, 10 m Air Rifle (Pairs), 50 m Rifle 3 positions, Rifle 3 positions (Pairs), 50 m Rifle Prone, 50 m Rifle Prone (Pairs)
 Michael Hockings - Small Bore- 10 m Air Rifle, 10 m Air Rifle (Pairs), 50 m Rifle 3 positions, 50 m Rifle 3 positions (Pairs)
 Metodi Igorov - Pistol- 25 m Centre Fire Pistol, 25 m Centre Fire Pistol (Pairs), 25 m Rapid Fire Pistol, 25 m Rapid Fire Pistol (Pairs)
 Scott Illingsworth - Pistol- 10 m Air Pistol, 10 m Air Pistol (Pairs), 25 m Standard Fire Pistol, 25 m Standard Fire Pistol (Pairs)
 Cynthia Meyer - Clay Target- Trap, Trap (Pairs), Double Trap, Double Trap (Pairs)
 Clayton Miller - Clay Target- Skeet, Skeet (Pairs)
 Yuri Movshovich - Pistol- 10 m Air Pistol, 10 m Air Pistol (Pairs), 25 m Rapid Fire Pistol (Pairs), 50 m Pistol, 50 m Pistol (Pairs)
 Susan Nattrass - Clay Target- Trap, Trap (Pairs), Double Trap, Double Trap (Pairs)
 Cory Niefer - Small Bore- 10 m Air Rifle, 10 m Air Rifle (Pairs), 50 m Rifle 3 positions, 50 m Rifle 3 positions (Pairs), 50 m Rifle Prone, 50 m Rifle Prone (Pairs)
 James Paton - Full Bore- Queens Prize, Queens Prize (Pairs)
 Kirk Reynolds - Clay Target- Trap, Trap (Pairs), Double Trap, Double Trap (Pairs)
 John Rochon - Pistol- 25 m Centre Fire Pistol, 25 m Centre Fire Pistol (Pairs), 25 m Rapid Fire Pistol, 25 m Rapid Fire Pistol (Pairs), 50 m Pistol, 50 m Pistol (Pairs)
 Johan Sauer - Small Bore- 50 m Rifle Prone, 50 m Rifle Prone (Pairs)
 Joe Trinci - Clay Target- Skeet, Skeet (Pairs)
 Patrick Vamplew - Full Bore- Queens Prize, Queens Prize (Pairs)

Squash 
 Shawn Delierre - Singles, Doubles
 Matthew Giuffre - Singles, Doubles, Mixed Doubles
 Shahier Razik - Singles
 Runa Reta - Singles, Mixed Doubles
 Graham Ryding - Singles

Table tennis 
 Wennin Chiu - Team, Singles, Doubles, Mixed Doubles
 Bence Csaba - Team, Singles, Doubles, Mixed Doubles
 Pierre-Luc Hinse - Team, Singles, Doubles, Mixed Doubles
 Faazil Kassam - Team, Singles, Doubles, Mixed Doubles
 Zhang Mo - Team, Singles, Doubles, Mixed Doubles
 Peter-Paul Pradeeban - Team, Singles, Doubles, Mixed Doubles
 Qiang Shen - Team, Singles, Doubles, Mixed Doubles
 Chris Xu - Team, Singles, Doubles, Mixed Doubles
 Shirley Yan - Team, Singles, Doubles, Mixed Doubles
 Sara Yuen - Team, Singles, Doubles, Mixed Doubles

Triathlon

Men 
 Colin Jenkins
 Brent McMahon
 Paul Tichelaar

Women 
 Gillian Kornell
 Jill Savege
 Suzanne Weckend

Weightlifting

Men 
 Kenneth Doyle - EAD- Powerlifting
 Sébastien Groulx - 62 kg
 Francis Luna-Grenier - 69 kg
 Nick Roberts - 94 kg
 Akos Sandor - 105 kg
 Dalas-John Santavy - 94 kg

Women 
 Marilou Dozois-Prévost - 48 kg
 Christine Girard - 63 kg
 Jeane Lassen - 69 kg
 Miel McGerrigle - 63 kg
 Emily Quarton - 58 kg
 Maryse Turcotte - 53 kg

See also 
 
Canada at the 2007 Pan American Games
Canada at the 2008 Summer Olympics

External links 
 Commonwealth Games Canada
 Athletics Canada
 Sports Canada - CWG Games Coverage
 Real Champions 

2006
Nations at the 2006 Commonwealth Games
Commonwealth Games